Okzhetpes Stadium is a multi-purpose stadium in Kokshetau, Kazakhstan.  It is currently used mostly for football matches and is the home stadium of FC Okzhetpes of the Kazakhstan Premier League. The stadium opened in 1955.

Features
The stadium has a capacity for 4,500 spectators.

External links
Stadium information

References

FC Okzhetpes
Sport in Kokshetau
Football venues in Kazakhstan
Multi-purpose stadiums in Kazakhstan